Cape Cheetham is an ice-covered cape forming the northeast extremity of Stuhlinger Ice Piedmont, Victoria Land, Antarctica. The geographical feature was first charted by members of the British Antarctic Expedition, 1910–13, who explored this coast in the Terra Nova in February 1911, and named for Alfred B. Cheetham, boatswain on the Terra Nova. This identification of Cape Cheetham is in accord with the location assigned on maps of the Australian National Antarctic Research Expeditions (Thala Dan), 1962. The headland lies situated on the Pennell Coast, a portion of Antarctica lying between Cape Williams and Cape Adare.

References

 

Headlands of Victoria Land
Pennell Coast